Midtown West may refer to:

 Midtown West (commercial development), a mixed-use commercial complex in West Midtown, Atlanta
 West Midtown, a district of Atlanta, Georgia
 West Midtown, Manhattan, New York
 Hell's Kitchen, Manhattan, New York
 Midtown West, a structure in the Akasaka, Minato, Tokyo development Tokyo Midtown

See also
 Midtown (disambiguation)